The 1992 Scotland rugby union tour of Australia was a series of matches played in May and June 1992 in Australia by Scotland national rugby union team.

Results 
Scores and results list Scotland's points tally first.

Touring party 
Manager: C. Ritchie
Coach: J. R. Dixon
Assistant coach: David Johnston
Captain: David Sole

Backs 

D. C. Bain
Craig Chalmers
Peter Dods
Gavin Hastings
Scott Hastings
Sean Lineen
Kenny Logan
D. B. Millard
Andy Nicol
Graham Shiel
Tony Stanger
Derek Stark
Gregor Townsend
Iwan Tukalo

Forwards 

Ian Corcoran
Damian Cronin
Chris Gray
Kenny Milne
David Sole
Rob Wainwright
Peter Wright

References 

1992 rugby union tours
1992
1992
History of rugby union matches between Australia and Scotland
1991–92 in Scottish rugby union
1992 in Australian rugby union